General Wilcox may refer to:

Cadmus M. Wilcox (1824–1890), Confederate States Army major general
John T. Wilcox (fl. 1990s–2020s), U.S. Air Force major general